"Wrong Side of A Love Song" is a song by Canadian R&B and soul singer–songwriter Melanie Fiona from her second studio album, The MF Life. Produced by Jack Splash. It was released March 20, 2012, on SRC Records and Universal Republic Records.

"Wrong Side of A Love Song" was nominated for a Grammy Award in 2013.

Music video
The music video for Melanie Fiona's Grammy nominated single, "Wrong Side Of A Love Song" was directed by Larenz Tate and features actor Omari Hardwick.

References

External links 
   Retrieved 1/5/2013 
  Songfacts posts Retrieved 1/5/2013 

Melanie Fiona songs
2012 songs